Barbara Francine de Jong (born 22 June 1952) is a retired Dutch rower. Her teams finished in eights place at the 1975 World Championships in the coxed fours and at the 1976 Summer Olympics in the coxed eights events.

References

External links
 
 
 

1952 births
Living people
Dutch female rowers
Olympic rowers of the Netherlands
Rowers at the 1976 Summer Olympics
Sportspeople from Enschede
20th-century Dutch people